The Irish Grand Prix also known Irish International Grand Prix was an open-wheel racing car motor race which was held three times on a 4.25 mile circuit laid out in the grounds of Phoenix Park in Dublin.

The Grand Prix was actually two separate handicap races held under a single banner of the Irish International Grand Prix. Friday's race was for cars up to 1500 cc whose drivers competed for the Saorstát Cup, while on Saturday the drivers in the more powerful cars (over 1500 cc) raced for the Éireann Cup. The overall winner of the Irish Grand Prix was decided by the driver who completed the 300 mile race distance from either the Saorstát Cup or Éireann Cup races in the fastest time over the two days.

The first year of the event was 1929 when Boris Ivanowski, a former imperial officer in the Russian army was dominant, racing and winning both the Saorstát Cup and Éireann Cup races driving an Alfa Romeo to claim the inaugural Irish Grand Prix. In the Saorstát Cup race his victory margin was over a minute ahead of Sammy Davis (Lea-Francis), finishing in a time of 3h:41m:30s. In the Éireann Cup race it was a much closer battle between Ivanowski's Alfa Romeo and England's Glen Kidston (Bentley), with the Russian completing the 300 mile race distance in a time of 3h:40m:54s, only 14 seconds ahead of Kidston in second place, followed by Henry Birkin (Bentley) in third.

In 1930 Germany's Rudolf Caracciola dominated in the Éireann Cup race to claim the Irish Grand Prix for Mercedes. By 1931 the entry of the two races looked markedly different, with smaller cars racing in the Saorstát Cup and larger cars racing in the Éireann Cup.

Winners of the Irish International Grand Prix Races

References 

Pre-World Championship Grands Prix
Auto races in Ireland
National Grands Prix
Recurring sporting events established in 1929
Phoenix Park